Rosemary Eleanor Florence White (born 6 June 1993) is a New Zealand footballer who last played as a midfielder for OL Reign in the National Women's Soccer League and the New Zealand national team.

Club career

In July 2015, White signed for English FA WSL champions Liverpool Ladies. Liverpool manager Matt Beard expected White to increase the team's attacking options. In 2015 Liverpool slumped to a seventh-place finish, but White was handed a new contract in November 2015.

On 9 November 2016, she signed with the Boston Breakers of the NWSL where she reunited with former Liverpool head coach Matt Beard. White played in 22 games for Boston and scored 4 goals.

After the Boston Breakers folded ahead of the 2018 NWSL season, White was selected by the Chicago Red Stars with the 7th pick in the Breakers Dispersal Draft on 30 January 2018. She began the 2018 season on the 45-day disabled list as she recovered from right and left navicular fractures. White made her debut for the Red Stars on 26 May against the Orlando Pride. White made 12 appearances and scored 1 goal for the Red Stars in 2018.

Ahead of the 2019 NWSL season the Red Stars announced that White would not be returning to the team in order to prepare for the 2019 FIFA Women's World Cup with New Zealand. Both the club and White will re-evaluate the possibility of a return to the team after the World Cup.

After the 2019 FIFA Women's World Cup, White signed with Reign FC on July 16, 2019.

In December 2021, OL Reign waived the rights to White and she left the club.

International career
White is a New Zealand international. She previously represented her country at the under-17 and under-20 levels.

White achieved a unique double by scoring a hat-trick against Colombia in the 2008 FIFA U-17 Women's World Cup and a second against Chile in the 2008 FIFA U-20 Women's World Cup two weeks later. In 2010, she represented New Zealand at the 2010 FIFA U-20 Women's World Cup in Germany, appearing in all three group games.

White made her senior Football Ferns debut as a substitute in a 0–6 loss to China PR on 10 January 2009. Having been a prolific scorer for the Under-17 and Under-20 teams, White remained goalless for the Football Ferns until her 14th appearance when she scored in a 14–0 win over Vanuatu on 29 September 2010.

She played in two matches out of New Zealand's three in each of FIFA Women's World Cup in Germany 2011 and Canada 2015.

In July 2016, White was named to the Football Ferns' squad for the 2016 Summer Olympics. She appeared in two of New Zealand's three matches, both as second-half substitutes.

International goals

References

External links

 Profile at New Zealand player profile
 Boston Breakers player profile
 
 Rosie White at UCLA

1993 births
Living people
New Zealand women's association footballers
New Zealand women's international footballers
2011 FIFA Women's World Cup players
2015 FIFA Women's World Cup players
Footballers at the 2012 Summer Olympics
Olympic association footballers of New Zealand
UCLA Bruins women's soccer players
Liverpool F.C. Women players
Boston Breakers players
Chicago Red Stars players
Association footballers from Auckland
Women's association football forwards
Expatriate women's footballers in England
Expatriate women's soccer players in Australia
Expatriate women's soccer players in the United States
New Zealand expatriate sportspeople in England
New Zealand expatriate sportspeople in Australia
Women's Super League players
National Women's Soccer League players
Footballers at the 2016 Summer Olympics
2019 FIFA Women's World Cup players
FIFA Century Club
OL Reign players
New Zealand expatriate women's association footballers